Kensi Tangis (born January 20, 1990) is a Ni-Vanuatu footballer who plays as a forward for Vanuatu topclub Galaxy and the Vanuatu national football team.

Club career

International career

International goals
Scores and results list Vanuatu's goal tally first.

References 

Living people
1990 births
Vanuatuan footballers
Vanuatu international footballers
People from Sanma Province
Solomon Warriors F.C. players
ABM Galaxy F.C. players
Association football forwards
Vanuatuan expatriate footballers
Expatriate footballers in the Solomon Islands
Vanuatuan expatriate sportspeople in the Solomon Islands
2012 OFC Nations Cup players
2016 OFC Nations Cup players